Homstean or Slettebrotane is a village in Vennesla municipality in Agder county, Norway.

That area has had some notable archaeological finds over the year including a very old ski that is now in a museum in Oslo.

References

Villages in Agder
Vennesla